Robert Gibson Ferguson (born 5 January 1902) was a Scottish professional footballer who played as a centre-half for Sunderland.

References

1902 births
Footballers from Glasgow
Scottish footballers
Association football defenders
Queen's Park F.C. players
Cambuslang Rangers F.C. players
Sunderland A.F.C. players
Middlesbrough F.C. players
Northwich Victoria F.C. players
English Football League players
Year of death missing